Arthur Annesley Ronald Firbank (17 January 1886 – 21 May 1926) was an innovative English novelist. His eight short novels, partly  inspired by the London aesthetes of the 1890s, especially Oscar Wilde, consist largely of dialogue, with references to religion, social-climbing, and sexuality.

Biography
Arthur Annesley Ronald Firbank was born on 17 January 1886, in Clarges Street, Westminster, the son of a Member of Parliament, Sir Thomas Firbank, and Lady Firbank, née Harriet Jane Garrett. He had an older brother, Joseph Sydney (born 1884), a younger brother, Hubert Somerset (born 1887), and a sister, Heather (born 1888). At the age of ten Firbank went briefly to Uppingham School (September 1900 to April 1901) and then on to Trinity Hall, Cambridge. He converted to Roman Catholicism in 1907. In 1909 he left Cambridge without taking a degree.

Living off his inheritance, he travelled around Spain, Italy, the Middle East, and North Africa. Openly gay and chronically shy, he was an enthusiastic consumer of alcohol and cannabis.

Work

Firbank published his first story, "Odette d'Antrevernes", in 1905, before going up to Cambridge. He then produced a series of novels, from The Artificial Princess (written in 1915, published posthumously in 1934) and Vainglory (1915, his longest work) to Concerning the Eccentricities of Cardinal Pirelli (1926, also posthumous).

Inclinations (1916) is set mainly in Greece, where the fifteen-year-old Mabel Collins is travelling with her chaperone, Miss O'Brookomore. Mabel elopes with an Italian conte, but the plot is of minor importance and the interest, as with all Firbank's work, lies in the dialogue. His next novel Caprice followed in 1917.

Valmouth (1919) is based on the lives of various people in a health resort on the West Coast of England; most of the inhabitants are centenarians, and some are older ("the last time I went to the play...was with Charles the Second and Louise de Querouaille, to see Betterton play Shylock"). The inconsequential plot is concerned with the attempts of two elderly ladies, Mrs Hurstpierpoint and Mrs Thoroughfare, to marry off the heir to Hare-Hatch House, Captain Dick Thoroughfare. Captain Thoroughfare, who is engaged to a black woman, Niri-Esther, is loved frantically by Thetis Tooke, a farmer's daughter, but prefers his 'chum', Jack Whorwood, to both of them. Meanwhile Mrs Yajñavalkya, a black masseuse, manages an alliance between the centenarian Lady Parvula de Panzoust and David Tooke, Thetis's brother. A musical comedy of 1958 by Sandy Wilson gave the novel some popularity in the 1960s, and has been revived several times and recorded on CD.

This was followed by a story, "Santal" (1921), that describes an Arab boy's search for God. In his next novel, The Flower Beneath The Foot (1923), the setting is an imaginary country somewhere in the Balkans. The characters include the King and Queen, sundry high-born ladies about the Court, and the usual attendant chorus of priests and nuns.

Sorrow in Sunlight (1924), renamed Prancing Nigger at the suggestion of the American publisher but first published in Britain under the author's original title, was especially successful in America. It is set in a Caribbean republic (compounded of Cuba and Haiti). A socially ambitious black family move from their rural home to the capital, and the story is concerned with their attempts, which prove mainly abortive, to 'get into society'.

Concerning the Eccentricities of Cardinal Pirelli (1926) begins with Cardinal Pirelli christening a dog in his cathedral ("And thus being cleansed and purified, I do call thee 'Crack'!") and ends with his dying of a heart attack while chasing, naked, a choirboy around the aisles.

Firbank's play The Princess Zoubaroff (1920) has been compared to William Congreve, but is rarely produced. Dame Edith Evans played the title part in a radio production in 1964. The dialogue is highly characteristic: for example, Princess Zoubaroff says: "I am always disappointed with mountains. There are no mountains in the world as high as I would wish... They irritate me invariably. I should like to shake Switzerland."

Firbank's Complete Short Stories were published in 1990 in a single volume edited by Steven Moore, and his Complete Plays in 1991, with The Princess Zoubaroff, The Mauve Tower and A Disciple from the Country.

Ronald Firbank left among his manuscripts the first few chapters of a novel set in New York, The New Rythum (sic). These were published in 1962 after a sale of many of his manuscripts and letters.

Critical reception
British author Richard Blake Brown was described as a "Firbankian" novelist due to the similar style in his writing. However, in 1951, Brown wrote that he grows weary of the claimed influence of Firbank's writing on his own. Playwright Joe Orton was also an admirer of Firbank's works, calling him "the only impressionist in the English novel" and "the source." He added that although he enjoyed several of Firbank's novels, he described his own writing as containing a greater vivid personal imagination when compared with Firbank's.<ref>" BROWN, Richard Blake", "Between the Covers. Retrieved on 28 July 2022.</ref> 

His novels have been championed by many English novelists including E. M. Forster, Evelyn Waugh, Alan Hollinghurst and Simon Raven. The poet W. H. Auden praised him highly in a radio broadcast on the BBC Third Programme in June 1961 (the text of the broadcast was published in The Listener of 8 June 1961). Susan Sontag named his novels as part of "the canon of camp" in her 1964 essay "Notes on 'Camp'".

In her 1973 critical biography, Prancing Novelist, Brigid Brophy examines Firbank's cult of Oscar Wilde.

Angela Carter created a radio play inspired by the life of Firbank called A Self-Made Man which was first broadcast on Radio 3 in 1984. 

Steven Moore records Firbank's critical reception up to 1995 in his Ronald Firbank: An Annotated Bibliography of Secondary Materials (Dalkey Archive Press, 1996).

In Alan Hollinghurst's novel The Swimming Pool Library Firbank's work and life are central themes.

Published works
Early publications
 "An Early Flemish Painter", in The Academy; 73 (28 September 1903), p. 948 (about Jan Gossaert)
 "La Princesse aux soleils, romance parlée ...(Trad. de l'anglais par l'auteur)", in Les Essais. Revue Mensuelle; II (November 1904), pp. 78–80
 "Harmonie ... (trad. de l'anglais par l'auteur)", in Les Essais. Revue Mensuelle; II (February 1905), pp. 305–06
 "Souvenir d'automne. A Poem In Prose". Supplement to The King and His Navy and Army; 21 (2 December 1905)
 Odette d'Antrevernes and A Study in Temperament (stories, Elkin Mathews, 1905)
 Odette d'Antevernes (1905, separate large-paper edition; reprinted by Grant Richards in 1916 as Odette: A Fairy Tale for Weary People, with four illustrations by Albert Buhrer)
 "The Wavering Disciple. A Fantasia", in Granta; 20 (1906 November 24), pp. 110–11 and 20 (5 December 1906), pp. 130–32
 "A Study In Opal", in Granta; 21 (2 November 1907)

Major works
 Vainglory ... with a frontispiece by Félicien Rops (novel, 1915)
 Inclinations ... with two drawings by Albert Rutherston (Rothenstein) (novel, 1916)
 Caprice ... with a frontispiece by Augustus John (novel, 1917)
 "Fantasia For Orchestra In F Sharp Minor", in Art and Letters; II N.S. (1919 Spring), p. 64-79; draft of a chapter of Valmouth (1919)
 Valmouth - A Romantic Novel ... with a frontispiece by Augustus John (novel, 1919)
 The Princess Zoubaroff - A Comedy ... with frontispiece and decoration by Michel Sevier (play, 1920) 
 "Santal" (story, 1921)
 The Flower Beneath The Foot - Being a Record of the Early Life of St. Laura De Nazianzi and the Times in which She Lived ... with a decoration by C. R. W. Nevinson and portraits by Augustus John and Wyndham Lewis (novel, 1923)
 "A Broken Orchid" (from Sorrow in Sunlight), in The Reviewer; 4 (1923 October), p. 15-19
 Sorrow in Sunlight (published in the U.S. as Prancing Nigger; novel, 1924)
 Concerning the Eccentricities of Cardinal Pirelli (novel, 1926)

Posthumous publications
 The Artificial Princess ... With an Introduction by Sir Coleridge Kennard (novel, 1934) [written c. 1915].
 The Complete Ronald Firbank, with a preface by Anthony Powell, (1961).
 "Lady Appledore's Mesalliance", in Cornhill Magazine; 172 (story, summer 1962), pp. 399–425 [written c. 1908].
 The New Rythum and Other Pieces (novel fragment, 1962) [incl. extracts from The Mauve Tower (play written c. 1904), A Disciple From The Country (play), "The Widow's Love" and "A Tragedy in Green"].
 The Wind & The Roses ... Introduction by Miriam J. Benkovitz, privately printed (poem, 1966)
 Ronald Firbank Far Away ... Note by Miriam J. Benkovitz (1966) [written 1904].
 Ronald Firbank - When Widows Love & A Tragedy in Green ... Introduced by Edward Martin Potoker (1980).
 Letters to his Mother: 1920-1924. Edited with an introduction by Anthony Hobson. (2001).

Notes

Further reading
 Alford, Norman W. (1967). "Seven Notebooks of Ronald Firbank," Library Chronicle of the University of Texas, Austin, Vol. VIII, No. 3.
 Benkovitz, M. J. (1963). A Bibliography Of Ronald Firbank, Rupert Hart-Davis [Clarendon Press, Oxford, 1982].
 Braybrooke, Neville (1962). "Ronald Firbank 1886-1926," Ramparts Magazine, Vol. I, No. 2.
 Brooke, Jocelyn (1951). Ronald Firbank: A Study. London: Arthur Barker Limited.
 Brooke, Jocelyn (1962). Ronald Firbank and John Betjeman. London: Longmans, Green.
 Brophy, Brigid (1973). Prancing Novelist - A Defence Of Fiction In The Form Of A Critical Biography In Praise Of Ronald Firbank, Macmillan.
 Davis, Robert Murray (1964). The Externalist Method in the Novels of Ronald Firbank, Carl Van Vechten and Evelyn Waugh, University of Wisconsin.
 Davis, Robert Murray (1968). "Hyperaesthesia with Complications: The World of Ronald Firbank," Rendezvous: Journal of Arts and Letters, Vol. III, No. 1, pp. 5–15.
 Goldman, Jonathan (1999). "The Parrotic Voice of the Frivolous: Fiction by Ronald Firbank, I. Compton-Burnett, and Max Beerbohm," Narrative, Vol. 7, No. 3.
 Hollinghurst, Alan (1980). The Creative Uses of Homosexuality in the Novels of E. M. Forster, Ronald Firbank and L. P. Hartley, M. Litt. Thesis. Oxford: Bodleian Library.
 Hollinghurst, Alan (2001). "I Often Laugh When I'm Alone: The Novels of Ronald Firbank," The Yale Review, Vol. 89, Issue 2.
 Hollinghurst, Alan (2006). "The Shy, Steely Ronald Firbank" (revision of the third of Lord Northcliffe's Lectures given at University College, London, October 2006), in The Times Literary Supplement (2006 November).
 Horder, Mervyn (1977). Ronald Firbank - Memoirs and Critiques, London: Duckworth [Incorporates I. K. Fletcher's "Memoir"].
 Jones, Ernest (1949). "The World of Ronald Firbank," The Nation, 26 November.
 Kiechler, John Anthony (1969). The Butterfly's Freckled Wings: A Study of Style in the Novels of Ronald Firbank. Bern: Francke.
 Merritt, J. D. (1969). Ronald Firbank, Twayne Publishers.
 Moore, Steven (1996). Ronald Firbank - An Annotated Bibliography of Secondary Materials, 1905-1995, Dalkey Archive Press.
 Parker, Derek (1999). "The Man with Red Nails: Ronald Firbank", Books and Company, Susan Hill (ed), No. 4.
 Potoker, Edward Martin (1969). Ronald Firbank, Columbia University Press.
 Richards, Grant (1934). "Ronald Firbank – Mrs. Leverson – The Sitwells – The Powys Brothers." In Author Hunting, by an Old Literary Sports Man. New York, Coward-McCann, Inc.
 Richetti, John J. (1994). The Columbia History of the British Novel, Columbia University Press.
 Sitwell, Osbert (1950). Noble Essences. Boston: Little, Brown.
 Tindall, William York (1956). Forces in Modern British Literature: 1885-1956. New York: Random House.
 Wilson, Edmund (1950). "A Revival of Ronald Firbank." In Classics and Commercials: A Literary Chronicle of the Forties. New York, Farrar, Straus and Giroux.
 Wilson, Edmund (1952). The Shores of Light: A Literary Chronicle of the Twenties and Thirties. New York: Farrar, Straus and Young.
 Woodward, A. G. (1968). "Ronald Firbank," English Studies in Africa'', Vol. 11, Issue 1.

External links

 Finding aid to Ronald Firbank papers at Columbia University. Rare Book & Manuscript Library.
 
 
 
 
 
 
Archive Material in Leeds University Library
 Sorrow in Sunlight
 Ronald Firbank: An Inventory of His Collection at the Harry Ransom Center (University of Texas)
 

1886 births
1926 deaths
Alumni of Trinity Hall, Cambridge
British Roman Catholics
Converts to Roman Catholicism
English Roman Catholics
English Roman Catholic writers
English gay writers
Gay novelists
Burials at Campo Verano
British male novelists
20th-century British novelists
20th-century English male writers
English LGBT novelists